Abdul Ghafoor Yusufzai was an Afghan footballer, who competed at the 1948 Summer Olympic Games.

References

External links
 

Afghan footballers
Olympic footballers of Afghanistan
Footballers at the 1948 Summer Olympics
Possibly living people
Year of birth missing
Association football forwards
Footballers at the 1951 Asian Games
Asian Games competitors for Afghanistan